The Laval Rocket are a professional ice hockey team playing in the American Hockey League (AHL) as an affiliate of the National Hockey League (NHL)'s Montreal Canadiens. Based in Laval, Quebec, Canada, the Rocket play their home games at Place Bell.

The franchise was previously based in St. John's, Newfoundland and Labrador, as the St. John's IceCaps.

History
On July 11, 2016, the AHL and the Montreal Canadiens announced that they would be moving their affiliate to the Montreal suburb of Laval for the 2017–18 season.  A name-the-team contest was held from July 11 until August 31, with Patriots, Rapids and Rocket as the final three.  On September 8, the winning Laval Rocket name was announced, a tribute to Canadiens' legend Maurice "Rocket" Richard which got a 51% majority of the fan votes. The Rocket are the second hockey team in Greater Montreal to use that nickname, after the QMJHL's Montreal Rocket from 1999 until 2003. In June 2017, the franchise named Larry Carriere as general manager and retained Sylvain Lefebvre as head coach, a position he held since 2012 when the franchise played as the Hamilton Bulldogs.

In the 2017–18 season, Laval finished with a 24–42–7–3 record and placed last overall in the league. Lefebvre was relieved as head coach immediately upon the end of the season and was replaced by Joel Bouchard, who had been serving as head coach and general manager of the Blainville-Boisbriand Armada in the QMJHL.

For the 2020–21 season, the Rocket temporarily relocated to the Bell Centre in Montreal to share the facility with their parent team during the COVID-19 pandemic. The Rocket were the Canadian Division champions and second-best winning percentage in the league, while playing only the other four teams based in Canada and no postseason during the pandemic. After the season ended, head coach Bouchard left the team at the end of his contract, compiling a 83–67–24 record over three seasons, to become the head coach of the San Diego Gulls. The Rocket then hired Jean-François Houle as their third head coach.

Team information

Logos and uniforms 
On January 31, 2017, the Laval Rocket revealed the logo and jersey design that the team would wear during their inaugural season. The colours of the Laval Rocket jersey are red, white, and blue and were chosen to mirror the colours of their parent-club, the Montreal Canadiens. As a further tribute to Maurice "Rocket" Richard, patches with the number 9 and a stylized flame appear on each of the sleeves. The stylized flame is also found below the player's number on the back of the jersey and on the back of the player's socks.  Each sleeve also has a shield patch with the word Le Rocket found inside.  The name of the city the Rocket play out of, Laval, is displayed on each shoulder as well as in the neck tie region of the jersey.

The main logo is a large blue 'R' that is outlined and highlighted in white. The word 'Rocket' runs along the inside of the 'R' in white. While all other logos and patches alternate colours depending on the home or away jersey, the main logo remains blue on both the red and white jerseys.

Season-by-season results

Players

Current roster
Updated March 15, 2023.

|}

Team captains 

 Byron Froese, 2017–19
 Xavier Ouellet, 2019–22
 Alex Belzile, 2022–present

References

External links
Laval Rocket official website

 
American Hockey League teams
Montreal Canadiens minor league affiliates
Ice hockey teams in Montreal
Ice hockey clubs established in 2016
Sport in Laval, Quebec
2016 establishments in Quebec